The British Academy Television Craft Award for Best Special, Visual & Graphic Effects is one of the categories presented by the British Academy of Film and Television Arts (BAFTA) within the British Academy Television Craft Awards, the craft awards were established in 2000 with their own, separate ceremony as a way to spotlight technical achievements, without being overshadowed by the main production categories. According to the BAFTA website, this category is "for special, visual and graphic effects and recognises achievement in all of these crafts."

The category has gone through several name changes:
 It was first awarded with the British Academy Television Craft Award for Best Titles & Graphic Identity category under the name Best Visual Effects and Graphic Design in 2001, 2002 and 2013.
 In 2003 it was split presenting the Best Visual Effects category until 2012.
 Since 2014, the category is presented as Best Special, Visual & Graphic Effects.

Winners and nominees

2000s
Best Visual Effects and Graphic Design

Best Visual Effects

2010s
Best Visual Effects

Best Visual Effects and Graphic Design

Best Special, Visual & Graphic Effects

2020s

Note: The series that don't have recipients on the table had FX Team credited as the recipients of the award or nomination.

See also
 Primetime Emmy Award for Outstanding Special Visual Effects
 Primetime Emmy Award for Outstanding Special Visual Effects in a Supporting Role

References

External links
 

Special, Visual & Graphic Effects